Southern Pacific Railroad (SP) 2353 is one of 10 heavy 4-6-0 'Ten Wheel' steam locomotives built by Baldwin Locomotive Works in August 1912, designated the T-31 class. It was delivered to Southern Pacific in October and the boiler was changed in 1917. In 1927, 2353 was leased to the San Diego & Arizona line, and later returned to Southern Pacific in 1939, serving in the San Francisco Bay Area. 2353 was retired from service on 18 January 1957 and displayed for the next 29 years at the California Mid-Winter Fairgrounds in Imperial, California.

In 1984, the Mid-Winter Fair's operator donated 2353 to the Pacific Southwest Railway Museum, with physical transfer of the locomotive occurring in summer 1986. Over the next ten years, volunteers restored 2353 to working order, with its first public appearance under steam happening on March 2, 1996. 2353 was withdrawn from service again in 2001, with extensive boiler repairs required before it can run again. Since then 2353 has been on static display. 2353 then went back on the rails one more time on November 16, 2019, during the San Diego and Arizona Railway's 100th Anniversary, held at the museum.

Southern Pacific 2353 has at least one surviving sibling. Southern Pacific 2355 has been on static display in Mesa, Arizona's Pioneer Park since 1958. Efforts to cosmetically restore 2355 have been underway since at least 2008. 

The 2353 was used for a brief action scene in the 2001 movie Pearl Harbor. The filming occurred on its last day of operation. The locomotive was also seen when the Irish girl group B*Witched filmed the music video of their hit single "Jesse Hold On" in 1999. And it can also be seen passing Barbara Stanwyck at the beginning of the film  Clash By Night (1953). 2353 was also featured in a Levi's commercial.

References 

2353
Baldwin locomotives
4-6-0 locomotives
Individual locomotives of the United States
Standard gauge locomotives of the United States
Railway locomotives introduced in 1912
Preserved steam locomotives of California